The Little Rock Confederate Memorial is a stone memorial marker in Little Rock National Cemetery, Little Rock, Arkansas. Midway up the west side of the obelisk "U.D.C." is inscribed, with "1913" at the base of that side. Inscriptions on the sides of the base commemorate fallen Confederate Army soldiers. It was placed in 1913, paid for by the local chapter of the United Daughters of the Confederacy. The ceremony marked the first time that the federal government formally took charge of a former Confederate military cemetery.

The memorial was listed on the National Register of Historic Places in 1996.

See also

National Register of Historic Places listings in Little Rock, Arkansas

References

1913 sculptures
Historic district contributing properties in Arkansas
Monuments and memorials in Little Rock, Arkansas
Monuments and memorials on the National Register of Historic Places in Arkansas
National Register of Historic Places in Little Rock, Arkansas
Neoclassical architecture in Arkansas
Obelisks in the United States
United Daughters of the Confederacy monuments and memorials in Arkansas
1913 establishments in Arkansas